Point of View is a 2006 landmark public sculpture in bronze by James A. West; it sits in a parklet named for the work of art, Point of View Park, in Pittsburgh, Pennsylvania.

The piece depicts George Washington and the Seneca leader Guyasuta, with their weapons down, in a face-to-face meeting in October 1770, when the two men met while Washington was in the area examining land for future settlement along the Ohio River.

The work weighs 750 lbs. and cost $130,000 for materials with charitable donations of land, pedestal and artist time.

Point of View sits on the edge of Mount Washington (Grandview Avenue at Sweetbriar Street) on the westernmost end of Grand View Scenic Byway Park and the Grand View Scenic Byway, a designated Pennsylvania scenic byway.

The sculpture was dedicated on October 25, 2006, by mayor Luke Ravenstahl.

See also
 List of statues of George Washington
 List of sculptures of presidents of the United States

References

External links
 Point of View sculpture website
Diana Nelson Jones (2006). Point of View sculpture installation: story from the Pittsburgh Post-Gazette. Retrieved May 12, 2007.

2006 establishments in Pennsylvania
2006 sculptures
Bronze sculptures in Pennsylvania
Outdoor sculptures in Pennsylvania
Parks in Pittsburgh
Sculptures of men in Pennsylvania
Sculptures of Native Americans
Statues in Pennsylvania
Statues of George Washington
Monuments and memorials to George Washington in the United States